Digital painting is an established art medium that typically combines a computer, a graphics tablet, and software of choice. The artist uses painting and drawing with the stylus that comes with the graphics tablet to create 2D paintings within a digital art software. Digital artists, the first being digital brushes, utilize some multiple techniques and tools. These come standard with all digital art programs, but users can create their own by altering their shape, texture, size, and transfer. Many of these brushes are created to represent traditional styles like oils, acrylics, pastels, charcoal, and airbrushing, but not all. Other effective tools include layers, lasso tools, shapes, and masks. Digital painting has evolved to not just mimic traditional art styles but fully become its technique.

Digital painting is used by amateur and professional artists alike. Its use is particularly prevalent in commercial production studios that create games, television, and film. There are multiple reasons for this which applies to amateur artists as well. Digital painting enables artists to experiment with different techniques and colors easily as its use of layers, the undo function, and save files make it a non-destructive work process. Artists can always return to an earlier state within the art piece, so nothing is ever truly lost. This saves time and materials while giving the artist more freedom to create.

Comparison with traditional painting

There are multiple differences between traditional and digital painting. The first is that traditional painters paint on a surface such as a canvas or paper, and digital artist paints on a screen. This is a big difference because there’s a gap between the stylus nib and the screen sensor. This is called parallax. Newer tablets have reduced parallax to a minimum level resulting in very little displacement between the nib and the results of the nib. Traditional painters also have to be more intentional, planning their surfaces and media to get the size and effect they want. In contrast, digital artists have the freedom to alter their paintings throughout the entire process. The digital painting also takes up much less space. With traditional painting, it’s typical to have an easel, a palette, a place to put brushes, water to clean the brushes, rags, etc. Whereas with digital painting all that’s needed is a tablet, which is often small enough to fit in the painter’s lap.

Hardware 
Digital painting requires one of two types of hardware. The first is with a graphics tablet connected to a computer, and the second is with a standalone tablet. Graphic tablets can then be broken down into two categories: tablets without a screen and tablets with a screen. The first don’t have their screen, so the surface area of the tablet is mapped to the computer display. These can be more difficult to use as there’s a disconnect between the surface that’s being drawn on and the screen displaying the image. The second have screens, which are typically easier to use but are considerably more expensive. Tablets can also have both pressure sensitivity and tilt-response. Meaning both the pressure and the angle of the stylus affect the digital brush. Many companies produce graphics tablets, the most notable being Wacom, XP-Pen, and Huion.

Standalone tablets have increased portability as they don’t need to be tied to a computer, but they are usually smaller than equivalently priced graphics tablets. Some tablets that can be used for digital painting include iPads, Microsoft Surfaces, and the Wacom Mobile Studio.

Software 
There are many different types of software that digital painters utilize. These range from programs that are intended to mimic traditional painting programs such as Corel Painter to image manipulation software such as Adobe Photoshop. There are different benefits to each digital painting program so it depends on how the artist wishes to work and which tools are important to them. It also depends on the cost of these programs, with many switching to a subscription-based model instead of a single once-off purchase such as Clip Studio Paint, formerly known as Manga Studio.

Many digital painting software for computers have an app version for standalone tablets, but there are also apps designed entirely for them. Procreate is one of these apps.

Hybrid techniques 
There are other methods by which artists digitally paint, too; they can range from using different programs to achieving different effects. As in doing certain aspects in one program and then transferring to another for another aspect, this is typically more how 3D artists work. More commonly practiced would be doing the initial stages of a painting on a piece of paper or canvas and then photographing or scanning it into the digital painting software to complete the piece then further.

Origins

Sketchpad

The earliest graphical manipulation program was called Sketchpad.  Created in 1963 by Ivan Sutherland, a grad student at MIT, Sketchpad allowed the user to manipulate objects on a CRT (cathode ray tube). Sketchpad eventually led to the creation of the Rand Tablet for work on the GRAIL project in 1968, and the very first tablet was created.  Other early tablets, or digitizers, like the ID (intelligent digitizer) and the BitPad were commercially successful and used in CAD (Computer Aided Design) programs. Modern-day tablets are the tools of choice by digital painters.  WACOM is the industry leader in tablets ranging in size from 4” x 6” to 12” x 19” and are less than an inch thick. Other brands of graphic tablets are Aiptek, Monoprice, Hanvon, Genius, Adesso, Trust, Manhattan, Vistablet, DigiPro, etc.
All these graphic tablets have the basic functions of a mouse, so they can be used as a mouse, not only in graphic editors but also as a replacement for a mouse, and they are compatible with practically all Windows and Mac software.

Tablets
The idea of using a tablet to communicate directions to a computer has been an idea since 1968 when the RAND (Research and Development) company out of Santa Monica, developed the RAND tablet that was used to program. 
Digitizers were popularized in the mid-1970s and early 1980s by the commercial success of the ID (Intelligent Digitizer) and BitPad manufactured by the Summagraphics Corp. These digitizers were used as the input device for many high-end CAD (Computer Aided Design) systems as well as bundled with PC's and PC-based CAD software like AutoCAD.

MacPaint
 Main Artictle: MacPaint

An early commercial program that allowed users to design, draw, and manipulate objects was the program MacPaint. This program's first version was introduced on January 22, 1984, on the Apple Lisa. The ability to freehand draw and create graphics with this program made it the top program of its kind during 1984. The earlier versions of the program were called MacSketch and LisaSketch, and the last version of MacPaint was MacPaint 2.0 released in 1998.
Much of MacPaint's universal success was attributed to the release of the first Macintosh computer equipped with another program called MacWrite.  It was the first personal computer with a graphical user interface and lost much of the bulky size of its predecessor, the Lisa. The Macintosh was available at about $2500 and the combination of a smaller design made the computer a hit, exposing the average computer user to the graphical possibilities of the included MacPaint.

Adobe

Another early image manipulation program was Adobe Photoshop. It was first called Display and was created in 1987 by Thomas Knoll at the University of Michigan as a monochrome picture display program.  With help from his brother John, the program was turned into an image editing program called Imagepro but later changed to Photoshop.  The Knolls agreed on a deal with Adobe systems and Apple, and Photoshop 1.0 was released in 1991 for Macintosh. Adobe systems had previously release Adobe Illustrator 1.0 in 1986 on the Apple Macintosh. These two programs, Adobe Photoshop and Adobe Illustrator are currently two of the top programs used to produce digital paintings.  Illustrator introduced the uses of Bezier curves, which allowed the user to be incredibly detailed in their vector drawings.

Kid Pix
In 1988, Craig Hickman created a paint program called Kid Pix, which made it easier for children to create digital art. The program was created in black in white and after several revisions, was released in color in 1991.  Kid Pix was one of the first commercial programs to integrate color and sound in a creative format. While the Kid Pix was intentionally created for children, it became a useful tool for introducing adults to the computer as well.

Web-based painting programs
In recent years there has been a growth in the websites supporting online painting. The user is still drawing digitally with the use of software: often the software is on the server of the website which is being used. However, with the emergence of HTML5, some programs now partly use the client's web browser to handle some processing. The range of tools and brushes can be more limited than free-standing software. Speed of response, quality of color, and the ability to save to a file or print are similar in either media.

See also
 Art software
 Computer art
 Computer graphics
 Computer painting
 Digital Art by Microsoft
 Digital illustration
 Digital photography
 Electronic art
 New Media
 Software art

References

Further reading 
 Donald Kuspit The Matrix of Sensations  VI: Digital Artists and the New Creative Renaissance
 Joline Blais and Jon Ippolito, At the Edge of Art, Thames & Hudson Ltd, 2006
 Christiane Paul Digital Art, Thames & Hudson Ltd
 Donald Kuspit "Del Atre Analogico al Arte Digital" in Arte Digital Y Videoarte, Kuspit, D. ed., Consorcio del Circulo de Bellas Artes, Madrid
 Robert C. Morgan Digital Hybrids, Art Press volume #255, pp. 75–76
 Frank Popper From Technological to Virtual Art, MIT Press
 Bruce Wands Art of the Digital Age, London: Thames & Hudson
 Christine Buci-Glucksmann, "L’art à l’époque virtuel", in Frontières esthétiques de l’art, Arts 8, Paris: L’Harmattan, 2004
 Margot Lovejoy Digital Currents: Art in the Electronic Age Routledge 2004
 Brandon Taylor Collage Thames & Hudson Ltd, 2006, p. 221
 Wayne Enstice & Melody Peters, Drawing: Space, Form, & Expression, New Jersey: Prentice Hall
 Frank Popper Ecrire sur l'art : De l'art optique a l'art virtuel, L'Harmattan 2007
 Fred Forest Art et Internet, Editions Cercle D'Art / Imaginaire Mode d'Emploi
 Lieser, Wolf. Digital Art. Langenscheidt: h.f. ullmann. 2009

Graphics
Painting
Digital art
Contemporary art
New media
New media art
Conceptual art
Visual arts genres
Visual arts media
Computer art
Postmodern art